The Harrison H. Kennedy Award, often known simply as the Kennedy Award, is a high school sports award named for the late Wheeling, West Virginia native Harry H. Kennedy. It is given annually to the West Virginia High School Football Player of the Year as voted on by the West Virginia Sports Writers Association.  It is awarded every spring at the annual Victory Awards Dinner.  It is the second oldest statewide award, second only to the Hardman Award, which is presented to the Amateur Athlete of the Year.

Winners

Awards won by school 

This is a list of the schools who have had a player win a Kennedy Award once or more.  In total, players from 43 different schools have won a Kennedy Award.

References 

High school football trophies and awards in the United States